Subh-e-Pakistan is a Pakistani live morning show hosted by a research scholar Aamir Liaquat Hussain. It was first aired 19 November 2014 on Geo Entertainment. The show is preceded by morning show Utho Jago Pakistan, hosted by Shaista Wahidi which was banned due to act of blasphemy during the show. After being defunct for few months, the show was re-launched on 7 December 2015, under the title Subh-e-Pakistan Kahani Ke Sath on channel Geo Kahani. On May 23, 2020, Aamir Liaquat Hussain announced that the morning show Subh e Pakistan will be coming back to Express Tv after Ramadan

Segments 
The show is based on following segments that run throughout the programme:
 Allah Ke Babarkat Naam Se – Starting of the transmission by reciting verses of Quran.
 Ab Thora Sa Muskurao – In this segment, comedian Kashif Khan interact with the audience to spread smiles on their face.
 Diwar-e-Khabria – ‘In this segment, the host along with comedian Kashif Khan analyze the hidden humor in everyday Jang Newspaper. Along with the News, they also analyze videos from around the globe.
 Sitaron Ka Chal Chalan – In this segment an Astrologer forecast the horoscope of all zodiacs for the day.
 Ao Kuch Kaam Ki Baat Karen – This segment focuses on concluding social issues from the society. In the presence of a doctor, scholar, celebrity and an effected person, issues like dowry, marriage bureaus, social evils are discussed. On specifically Friday, issues are resolved in the light of Islam and what  Islam says on certain matters. The host also interact with the audience to take  their opinions.
 Masail Ka Hal Wazaif Se – In this segment, live calls are taken and Maulana Bashir Farooqi tells a spiritual remedy for the desired problem in the light of Quran and Sunnah.
 Robaro – This segment is a session between the host and guest celebrity, or honorable personality.
 Masnoon Dua
 Khutba
 Ronamai
 Aamir Se Dil Ki Baat
 Aap Ki Baat

Re-launch
In Ramadan 2015, Aamir Liaquat left the show to host Ramazan Sharif, a religious show for the whole month. After that he didn't joined back Subh-e-Pakistan. This morning was replaced by Nadia Khan Show on Geo Entertainment in November. Whereas on 7 December 2015 Subh-e-Pakistan was re-launched under the title Subh-e-Pakistan Kahani Ke Sath on Geo Kahani.

References

External links 
 

Pakistani television talk shows
Urdu-language television shows
Pakistani television series
Geo TV original programming